The 1950–51 season was Stoke City's 44th season in the Football League and the 30th in the First Division.

Stoke were rocked before the start of the season by the news that Neil Franklin and George Mountford had agreed to play for Independiente Santa Fe in Colombia. The transfer caused uproar amongst the FA and the pair were later punished. Stoke were again unimpressive as they finished in a mid table position of 13th.

Season review

League
Stoke were rocked before the start of the season by the news that Neil Franklin and George Mountford had agreed to play for Independiente Santa Fe in Colombia. The South American country at this time was not under the jurisdiction of FIFA and the two players came under heavy criticism, and Franklin was stripped from England international duties. However, despite the pair making a big impression on Colombian football the country was at a state of civil unrest and two months later Franklin returned to England. He never played for Stoke again and ended up with Hull City whilst George Mountford finished the season with Santa Fe and returned to Stoke.

The summer activities were still the gossip as the 1950–51 season opened with only one new signing at the Victoria Ground, goalkeeper Don Clegg who had an unsuccessful career. Jock Kirton was made captain and most fans lacked confidence in the squad now minus to key players. McGrory stated that his team was good enough for First Division football but admitted that he would have liked to bring in more players to the club. With the season five days old McGrory paid £8,000 on Crewe Alexandra forward Albert Mullard however in his first game for Stoke he injured his knee and suffered a lengthy lay-off.

Stoke had a season of mixed fortunes and whilst they were certainly good enough to stay out of relegation trouble they lacked the quality to claim a top half finished and ended up in 13th position which was not as bad as some of the supporters made out.

FA Cup
Stoke drew local rivals Port Vale in the third round and the two sides served up a thrilling cup tie. The initial clash with Vale took place on a heavy Victoria Ground pitch was seen by over 48,000 fans. In an entertaining first half Alan Bennett put Vale into the lead after six minutes and although Stoke pushed hard for an equaliser they couldn't beat Ray King. Then the Vale fans were celebrating again as their side went 2–0 up, Cliff Pinchbeck scoring after 45 seconds into the second half. Stoke were rattled and soon after Albert Mullard pulled one back with a crisp shot from the edge of the area and he then scored again to set up a frantic finale. However, with both teams battling it out in the mud the match finished in a fair draw. With Vale Park waterlogged it was back to the Victoria Ground and was again a tense encounter. Vale were the better team creating the most chances but with just seconds remaining Frank Bowyer who had been kept quite by the "Valiants" defence suddenly found space and headed in a Harry Oscroft cross to end the tie.

Stoke then beat West Ham United before losing 4–2 against Newcastle United in front of 48,500 at the Vic.

Final league table

Results

Stoke's score comes first

Legend

Football League First Division

FA Cup

Squad statistics

References

Stoke City F.C. seasons
Stoke City